Peucedanum camerunensis is a species of flowering plant in the family Apiaceae. It is found only in Cameroon, with natural habitat in subtropical or tropical dry lowland grassland.
N.B. According to the current version of the (authoritative) Plant List the correct name for this species is now
Peucedanum camerunense.

References

camerunensis
Endemic flora of Cameroon
Endangered plants
Taxonomy articles created by Polbot
Taxobox binomials not recognized by IUCN